Andrey Danchev was a Bulgarian linguist, Anglicist and Americanist who worked for the Department of English and American Studies at Sofia University.  Danchev was the author of a widely accepted system for the Bulgarian transcription of English names and, together with M. Holman, E. Dimova and M. Savova, also an English-oriented system for the Romanization of Bulgarian known as the Danchev System.

Honours
The St. Cyril and St. Methodius International Foundation, jointly with the Department of English and American Studies at Sofia University established in 1996 an Andrey Danchev Memorial Scholarship to encourage the academic growth of young people in the field of English language studies in Bulgaria.

Publications
 A. Danchev, Bulgarian transcription of English names, Narodna Prosveta, Sofia, 1982. (in Bulgarian)
 A. Danchev, M. Holman, E. Dimova, M. Savova, An English Dictionary of Bulgarian Names: Spelling and Pronunciation, Nauka i Izkustvo Publishers, 1989, 288 pp.

External links

1933 births
1996 deaths
Linguists from Bulgaria
20th-century linguists